Baby Jane Hudson is a fictional character and the antagonist of Henry Farrell's 1960 novel What Ever Happened to Baby Jane? She was portrayed by Bette Davis in the 1962 film adaptation and by Lynn Redgrave in the 1991 television remake. The 1962 production is the better-known, and Bette Davis received an Academy Award nomination for her performance. The character is portrayed by Susan Sarandon, who plays Bette Davis, in the TV anthology Feud: Bette and Joan.

Novel and film
At the start of the book, Baby Jane Hudson is a highly successful child star in vaudeville, billed as "The Diminutive Dancing Duse from Duluth". In the film version, a prologue set in 1917 shows Baby Jane performing with her father while her mother and sister Blanche watch from backstage. She is favored and spoiled by her father, while her mother attempts to soothe Blanche's envy and resentment by promising that one day she will achieve stardom.

The novel reveals that, when both parents die in the late-1910s flu pandemic, the sisters move to Hollywood to live with an aunt who favors Blanche the way their father used to treat Jane (this detail is absent in the film). By the mid-1930s, Blanche and Jane both have careers as Hollywood actresses. Blanche is a successful star, and Jane largely is reduced to working as an extra in her movies, a condition Blanche inserts in her contracts. Blanche is the leading lady of her era, but Jane is widely seen as a has-been, and the films she tries to make on her own are all critical and commercial failures.

One night, an inebriated Jane mocks and humiliates Blanche at a party, provoking Blanche into leaving in tears. That night, Blanche is paralyzed from the waist down in a mysterious car accident that is unofficially blamed on Jane, who is found three days later in a drunken stupor with no memory of the party and its aftermath. The accident ends Blanche's, and by extension, Jane's career. With the loss of income, the sisters move in together, and Jane spends the next three decades as Blanche's caretaker and cook, stoking bitter resentment which consumes her.

Over the years, Jane's mental illness worsens and she descends into alcoholism. Her appearance slowly becomes a grotesque caricature of her childhood self: hideously caked on make-up, greasy hair in curls, and dresses like a 10-year-old girl. A television retrospective honoring Blanche's old films sends Jane into a jealous rage as she is again reminded that no one remembers her career. Her anger only increases when she discovers that Blanche plans to sell the house and have her committed to a mental hospital.

Delusional and stuck in the past, she clings to hopes of reviving her childhood act despite being both too old and decades out of practice. She steals Blanche's money to pay for an accompanist and for adult-sized versions of her old Baby Jane costumes. She removes Blanche's telephone, making her a virtual prisoner in her room. At her first practice, Jane gets drunk and pathetically sings her signature song "I've Written a Letter to Daddy", a maudlin song from her vaudeville days. However, upon seeing her reflection in a mirror and realizing how hideous she looks, Jane snaps and shatters the glass. Her abuse of Blanche worsens when she kills Blanche's pet parakeet and serves it to her on a dinner platter; she later serves Blanche a dead rat in the same way. 

When Elvira Stitt, Blanche's cleaning woman, threatens to report Jane to the police, Jane kills her with a hammer and disposes of the dead body. After the police call about Elvira when her family reports her missing, Jane worries that she will be caught. Edwin Flagg, her accompanist, discovers Blanche bound and gagged in her bedroom; he calls the police and Jane flees to the seashore with Blanche.

On the beach, a near-death Blanche reveals that she is paraplegic by her own fault: She intended to kill Jane by running her down, but her car instead struck the metal gates outside their mansion, snapping Blanche's spine. Blanche blamed the accident on Jane, who was too drunk to remember, so she could force Jane to care for her. This revelation destroys what little remains of Jane's sanity, and she regresses to her childhood and becomes "Baby Jane" once again, dancing for startled on-lookers at the beach. When two policemen notice the Hudsons' illegally parked car nearby and link it to Elvira's death, they spot Blanche lying on the sand and rush to her aid. Jane is too caught up in her delusions to notice the policemen's presence.

Acting
For the film adaption, director Robert Aldrich mined the careers of stars Bette Davis and Joan Crawford (who played Blanche) by using their early (circa 1930s) film clips when the story called for examples of their characters' work. The other characters react to clips of Bette Davis's early roles with dismay at her "bad acting", and when clips of Joan Crawford's old movies are shown, the other characters speak with praise for her acting.  (Davis's scenes from the film Ex-Lady are presented out of context to make Jane Hudson's performance seem amateurish.)

References 

 

Characters in American novels of the 20th century
Fictional actors
Fictional singers
Fictional characters from Minnesota
Literary characters introduced in 1960
Fictional murderers
Fictional torturers
Female horror film villains
Female literary villains
Fictional alcohol abusers
Fictional kidnappers
Fictional characters with psychiatric disorders